Basket Club Alsace Bossue (BCAB) is a basketball club in Sarre-Union, France. BCAB was created in June 2007 by the fusion of CSL Sarre-Union and BC Butten Diemeringen. The club trains ten teams (seven junior and three adult).

Teams 
Children's Team is for 5 to 10 with only one team.
Junior Team are for 10 to 18 with two U11, one U13, two U15 and two U17.
Adult Teams are from 18 with two woman's teams and one man's team.

Results 
2014 Ranking
Poussines U11: 2nd division, pool A 6/6
Poussins U11:  2nd division, pool A 5/6
Benjamines U13: 2nd division, pool A 2/6
Minimes F U15: 1st division, pool A 6/6
Minimes M U15: 2nd division, pool A 6/6
Cadettes F U17: 2nd division, pool A 6/6
Cadets M U17: 2nd division, pool A 4/5
Adult F1: Excellence promotion, pool A 4/12
Adult F2: Excellence honor promotion, pool A 9/12
Adult M: 2nd division, pool A 7/12

Basketball teams in France
Bas-Rhin